Colobanthera is a genus of flowering plants in the family Asteraceae.

There is only one known species, Colobanthera waterlotii endemic to Madagascar.

References

Monotypic Asteraceae genera
Astereae
Endemic flora of Madagascar